Stylo may refer to:

 Stylosanthes, A widely cultivated plant genus native to the Americas
 Barratts Shoes A UK brand of footwear
 "Stylo" (song), a single from British virtual band Gorillaz